Toryumon or Tōryūmon may refer to:
Toryumon (Último Dragón), a professional wrestling school and the associated professional wrestling promotions
Dragon Gate, formerly Toryumon Japan, a Japanese professional wrestling promotion
KOTC: Toryumon, a mixed martial arts event held on January 30, 2010 in Okinawa, Japan
Toryumon, a 1994 arcade game